Autogram (English: Autograph) is the sixteenth studio album by Serbian pop-folk singer Ceca. It was released on 25 June 2016, around three years after the release of her previous album.

Background
Ceca announced that she was working on her new studio album in late 2015. At the beginning of 2016, she added that it would likely be released in June. On 19 June, she revealed the track listing and the title. The next day, she shared the cover art and the commercial, also announcing the release date as 25 June. The commercial included a snippet of "Didule". Soon after, the Serbian website Puls Online published a banner of the album that played a snippet of the song "Trepni" when users placed their mouse over it. Another two songs, "Autogram" and "Cigani", premiered on Serbian radio on 24 June. Lyric videos of all songs were uploaded to Ceca's YouTube channel on the night of 24 June.

Writing and composition
The album was recorded in 2015 and 2016. After working with Ceca for 20 years, Aleksandar Milić is not a part of this project. However, Damir Handanović, Ljiljana Jorgovanović and Marina Tucaković, who had previously worked with Ceca, wrote and produced several songs of Autogram. Ceca's daughter, Anastasija Ražnatović, recorded backing vocals on the album. The lyrics tell stories about infidelity, women's points of view, as well as pain and suffering in love.

Track listing

References

External links
 Ceca - Autogram

2016 albums
Ceca (singer) albums